13 Exorcisms is a 2022 Spanish supernatural horror film directed by Jacobo Martínez in his feature debut, which stars María Romanillos and José Sacristán in a demonically possessed girl versus exorcist priest relationship, along with Ruth Díaz and Urko Olazabal.

Plot 
Following a naive séance, and upon the strange behaviour ensuingly displayed by teenager Laura Villegas, the latter's deeply Catholic family calls a Vatican-sanctioned exorcist to intervene in the case of demonic possession.

Cast

Production 
A  Mr. Fields and Friends, Atresmedia Cine, Bambú Producciones and 13 E Movie AIE production, the film had the participation of Atresmedia, Movistar Plus+, AGADIC and Diputación de Ourense. It was shot in Galicia, including locations such as Ourense, Ordes, and Santiago de Compostela.

Release 
Distributed by Beta Fiction (thereby marking the company's debut as a distributor in the Spanish market), the film is set to be theatrically released in Spain on 4 November 2022. StudioCanal handled international sales.

Reception 
Raquel Hernández Luján of HobbyConsolas rated the film with 70 points ("good"), highlighting the cast's commitment, the most twisted scenes and the special effects as the best things about the film while citing the film's final coda as a negative element.

Beatriz Martínez of La Nueva España rated the film 3 out of 5 stars, pointing out that despite the helmer managing to pull a beginning eliciting just the right doses of suggestion and creeps, the perspective, initially anchored to the adolescent psyche of the character portrayed by an "extraordinary" Romanillos, becomes blurred, and "the climax is rushed and confusing, throwing away the achievements of its disturbing beginning".

Elsa Fernández-Santos of El País considered that the film "barely delves into its more realistic possibilities to offer [instead] a fiction that is slanted towards the fantastic, poorly constructed and that contributes very little to the genre", otherwise finding striking the direction of actors, as each one of them are seemingly in a different movie, with only Romanillos providing some truth to her character's portrayal.
 
Begoña del Teso of El Correo rated the film 2 out of 5 stars, arguing that it is "badly structured, badly lit, badly created" and pointing out that its makers "could not decide if they wanted to (badly) imitate 'The Exorcist' or 'Carrie'".

Accolades 

|-
| align = "center" | 2023 || 37th Goya Awards || Best Special Effects || Mariano García Marty, Jordi Costa ||  || 
|}

See also 
 List of Spanish films of 2022

References 

2022 horror films
Films shot in Galicia (Spain)
Spanish supernatural horror films
Religious horror films
Films about exorcism
Bambú Producciones films
Atresmedia Cine films
2022 directorial debut films
2020s Spanish films
2020s supernatural horror films
2020s Spanish-language films